The Evangelical Climate Initiative (ECI) is a campaign by US-American church leaders and organizations to promote market based mechanisms to mitigate global warming.

Statements
ECI's statements, calling for protecting the earth from global warming, pollution, extinctions.

History
The Evangelical Climate Initiative was launched in February 2006 by the National Association of Evangelicals. The NAE worked with the Center for Health and the Global Environment at Harvard Medical School to bring scientists and evangelical Christian leaders together to mitigate climate change.

It was initially signed by 86 evangelical leaders and the presidents of 39 evangelical colleges. The number of signatories had risen to over 100 by December 2007, and as of July 2011 over 220 evangelical leaders had signed the call to action. David P. Gushee, a professor of Christian ethics at Mercer University, helped draft the document.

See also 

Creation care
Sustainability

References

External links
Evangelical Climate Initiative
Climate Change: An Evangelical Call to Action with original list of signatories

Christianity and environmentalism
Evangelical parachurch organizations
Religious action on climate change
Environment of the United States